Richard Thomas Swatland (October 8, 1945 – April 9, 2022) was an American football guard who played one season in the American Football League (AFL) for the Houston Oilers. He played college football at Notre Dame and was selected in the 8th round (195th overall) of the 1968 NFL/AFL Draft by the New Orleans Saints. Swatland also spent time with the Bridgeport Jets of the Atlantic Coast Football League (ACFL), the Washington Redskins and New England Patriots of the National Football League (NFL), and the Hamilton Tiger-Cats of the Canadian Football League (CFL).

Early life and education
Swatland was born on October 8, 1945, in Stamford, Connecticut. He attended Stamford Catholic High School, where he was named all-state and All-American as a senior in 1963.

Swatland played college football at Notre Dame. As a freshman, he missed the entire football season. In his second year, Swatland became the team's starting right guard, though he could also play at left guard. In 1966, he was a starter on Notre Dame's undefeated national championship team. As a senior in 1967, Swatland was named second-team All-American by the Central Press Association.

Professional career
Swatland was selected in the 8th round (195th overall) of the 1968 NFL/AFL Draft by the New Orleans Saints. He signed a contract with the Saints in early June. He was released by the Saints in mid-August, but was recommended to play with their farm team, the Richmond Roadrunners.

Rather than play for the Roadrunners, Swatland signed a practice squad contract with the Houston Oilers along with Jim LeMoine. He was later promoted to the active roster to be the backup to Tom Regner, one of his teammates at Notre Dame. Overall, Swatland appeared in four games in the 1968 season, starting none. He wore number 64 with the Oilers.

Despite being "almost assured of a job" after Sonny Bishop retired, Swatland was released as part of the final roster cuts in 1969. On October 6, it was announced that he had joined the Bridgeport Jets of the Atlantic Coast Football League (ACFL).

In , Swatland was signed by the Washington Redskins, but did not make their final roster.

In , Swatland signed with the New England Patriots, but was placed on the injury waiver list and was released in August.

After being released by the Patriots, Swatland signed with the Hamilton Tiger-Cats of the Canadian Football League (CFL), but quit midseason. "On my way home I stopped at Niagara Falls and threw my spikes over the falls. I had enough," he later said.

Later life and death
Swatland later became a real estate lawyer. He died on April 9, 2022, at the age of 76.

References

1945 births
2022 deaths
American football offensive guards
Players of American football from Connecticut
Notre Dame Fighting Irish football players
New Orleans Saints players
Houston Oilers players
Atlantic Coast Football League players
Washington Redskins players
New England Patriots players
Hamilton Tiger-Cats players
Sportspeople from Stamford, Connecticut
Connecticut lawyers